This is a list of the main career statistics of Japanese professional tennis player, Kei Nishikori. To date, Nishikori has won 12 ATP singles titles including a record four consecutive titles at the Memphis Open. Other highlights of Nishikori's career thus far include reaching the finals of the 2014 Mutua Madrid Open, 2016 Miami Open, 2016 Rogers Cup and 2014 US Open, semifinal appearances at the 2014 ATP World Tour Finals and 2016 US Open, in addition to quarterfinal finishes at the 2012 Australian Open, 2015 Australian Open, 2016 Australian Open and 2015 French Open. Nishikori achieved a career high singles ranking of world No. 4 on March 2, 2015.

Singles performance timeline

{{Performance key|short=yes}}
Current through the 2021 Indian Wells Masters.

Grand Slam tournament finals

Singles: 1 (1 runner-up)

Other significant finals

ATP Masters 1000 finals

Singles: 4 (4 runner-ups)

Olympic medal matches

Singles: 1 (1 Bronze medal)

ATP career finals

Singles: 26 (12 titles, 14 runner-ups)

Doubles: 1 (1 runner-up)

Challenger and Futures Finals

Singles: 9 (7–2)

Doubles: 2 (2–0)

Record against top-10 players
Nishikori's match record against players who have been ranked in the top 10, with those who are active in boldface. Only ATP Tour main draw matches are considered.

Top 10 wins
He has a  record against players who were, at the time the match was played, ranked in the top 10.

Career Grand Slam tournament seedings

*

ATP Tour career earnings

* Statistics correct .

Davis Cup

Participations: 23 (20–3)

   indicates the outcome of the Davis Cup match followed by the score, date, place of event, the zonal classification and its phase, and the court surface.

Notes

References

External links
 
 
 

Nishikori, Kei